The Derby Grand Prix (in Japanese: ダービーグランプリ), is a race for three-year-olds in the Iwate Prefecture Horse Racing Association.

Race details

The race was established in 1986. It was for 4-year-olds, but changed to 3-year-olds in 2001.

The race was graded as a Grade-1 race in 1997 and was then moved down to Grade-M1 in 2016.

The race took place at Morioka Racecourse from 1996-2011.

Winners since 2014

Past winners

Past winners include:

See also
 Horse racing in Japan
 List of Japanese flat horse races

References

Horse races in Japan
Recurring sporting events established in 1986